Ščuke pa ni, ščuke pa ne is a Slovenian television comedy series, created by Slovenian writer Tone Partljič and directed by Jože Babič.

The original show was aired in 1980 on first channel of RTV Ljubljana. Screenplay by Tone Partljič and music was composed by Krunoslav Cipci.

Plot
The story was set in a town municipality office. Workers have a good boss, they don't have to work so hard. They gossip each other a lot, they have parties.

Main characters
Silvo Kremžar (Danilo Bezlaj)...an office manager
Katica Kremžar (Milena Muhič)...Silvo's wife
Klander (Danilo Benedečič)
Štefka Klander (Angela Janko)...an office housekeeper
Franc Karic (Janez Klasinc)
Matilda Šmigoč (Breda Pugelj)
Helena Jelenc (Minu Kjuder)...a crying, soft lady
Fonza (Janez Hočevar)...an office telephone operator

Episodes

External links
Ščuke pa ni, ščuke pa ne at Slovenian Film Fund

Slovenian television series
1980 Slovenian television series debuts
1980 Slovenian television series endings
1980s Slovenian television series
Radiotelevizija Slovenija original programming